The 2021–22 season is Ludogorets Razgrad's eleventh consecutive season in the Bulgarian First League, of which they were defending champions.

Season events
On 26 May, Ludogorets announced the signing of Sergio Padt from Groningen.

On 11 June, Ludogorets announced the return of Ihor Plastun from Gent.

On 14 June, Dragoș Grigore and Ludogorets ended their contract by mutual agreement.

On 17 June, Ludogorets announced the signing of Dorin Rotariu from Astana.

On 19 June, Ludogorets announced the permanent signing of Kiril Despodov from Cagliari after a successful loan deal.

On 29 June, Ludogorets announced the signing of Shaquille Pinas from ADO Den Haag, and the permanent signing of Bernard Tekpetey from Schalke 04.

On 30 June, Vladislav Stoyanov, Cosmin Moți and Svetoslav Dyakov all left Ludogorets after their contracts ended.

On 21 July, Anicet Abel and Ludogorets ended their contract by mutual agreement.

On 19 August, Dan Biton was sold to Maccabi Tel Aviv.

On 27 August, Claudiu Keșerü and Ludogorets ended their contract by mutual agreement.

On 30 August, Jorginho was loaned to Wisła Płock until 30 June 2022.

On 21 December, Ludogorets announced the signing of Rick from Ceará. Two days later, 23 December, Ludogorets announced the signing of Spas Delev.

On 28 December, goalkeeper Kristijan Kahlina was sold to Major League Soccer club Charlotte.

On 3 January, Ludogorets announced Ante Šimundža as their new Head Coach.

On 4 January, Ludogorets sold Dimitar Mitkov to Lokomotiv Sofia.

On 15 January, Ludogorets announced the signing of Žan Karničnik from Mura.

On 31 January, Ludogorets announced that Elvis Manu had left the club by mutual consent, and that they had signed Simon Sluga from Luton Town.

On 2 February, Ludogorets sold Stéphane Badji to Eyüpspor and Mavis Tchibota to Maccabi Haifa.

The following day, 3 February, Josué Sá joined Maccabi Tel Aviv on loan for the rest of the season.

On 12 February, Ludogorets announced the signing of Matías Tissera from Platense.

Squad

Out on loan

Transfers

In

Out

Loans out

Released

Friendlies

Competitions

Overview

Bulgarian Supercup

Parva Liga

Regular stage

Table

Results summary

Results by round

Results

Championship stage

Table

Results summary

Results by round

Results

Bulgarian Cup

UEFA Champions League

Qualifying rounds

UEFA Europa League

Group stage

Squad Statistics

Appearances and goals

|-
|colspan="16"|Players away from the club on loan:

|-
|colspan="16"|Players who appeared for Ludogorets Razgrad that left during the season:

|}

Goal scorers

Clean sheets

Disciplinary Record

References

Notes

Ludogorets Razgrad
PFC Ludogorets Razgrad seasons
Ludogorets Razgrad
Bulgarian football championship-winning seasons